Tiberias is a city in Israel.

Tiberias may also refer to:

Places and associated facilities

Australia
 Tiberias, Tasmania, a locality

Israel
 Tiberias Subdistrict, a subdistrict in Israel
 Tiberias, a city
 Tiberias Municipal Stadium
 Tiberias Football Stadium

Palestine
 Tiberias Subdistrict, Mandatory Palestine, a former subdistrict in Palestine

Other uses
 Tiberias Marathon, a road race in Israeli
 Tiberias Germanicus, a Roman emperor
 Tiberias massacre, a massacre in Tiberias

See also
 Tiberius (disambiguation)